A New Beginning is a point-and-click adventure video game developed by Daedalic Entertainment and published by Lace Mamba Global for Microsoft Windows, OS X and iOS.

Gameplay 
The game is divided into 11 asynchronous chapters. The player controls Fay or Bent depending on the situation. The player can't switch interactively between them.

Plot 
The game starts in the far future. Due to ecological disasters life is only possible in caves deep under the ground. Many lifeforms and organisms have become extinct and even the human race is about to disappear. Some inventors were able to develop a time machine which uses some kind of radiocarbon dating. They now send some researchers back in time by using some sample which was made in the year 2050. Fay and her coworker arrive in a ruined San Francisco. Fay contacts the other time travelers, but they all end up in some natural disaster and most of them die. Salvador concludes their team must travel back in time to a year where ecological problems already exist, but still can be solved. In their search they find an article about Bent Svensson who invented a biofuel based upon blue algae. They also find an article how earth got partially destroyed after a nuclear reactor exploded in the Brazilian Amazon rainforest. This event destroyed the rain forest causing to start a chain reaction in which the earth went into a nuclear winter. The team travels back in time. However, it turns out Bent had to go on retirement due to health issues. The project is now led by his son Duve. Fay must convince Bent she really is from the future, the biofuel is the only solution to save the planet and the product must go in production right away. However, everyone has some reason to manipulate things for own purposes. This might fail the rescue of earth—or not.

Development
According to Daedalic's Carsten Fichtelmann, Valve rejected A New Beginning and Edna & Harvey: The Breakout three times from its Steam platform "on the grounds that their target audience did not care about the game". However, Daedalic went on to achieve success on the platform.

Reception

Domestic

International

A New Beginning received mixed reviews. It received an aggregated score of 67.88% on GameRankings based on 8 reviews and 72/100 on Metacritic based on 20 reviews.

Soundtrack 
While A New Beginning's soundtrack was primarily composed by Knights of Soundtrack, the credits list a number of additional people, who contributed music to the game. The main theme was written by Periscope Studios, Bent's Theme by André Navratil and Damian Zur. Florian Behnsen and Giliam Spliethoff contributed additional music, while serving as the game's soundtrack and SFX supervisors. The musical styles displayed, range from orchestral underscore, to incidental pieces in a 1980s Europop style and lounge music.

In 2010, the soundtrack received the German Developers Award for Best Soundtrack.

Track listing

References

External links 
 

2010 video games
Daedalic Entertainment games
Cancelled Nintendo DS games
Cancelled Wii games
IOS games
MacOS games
Point-and-click adventure games
Post-apocalyptic video games
Eco-terrorism in fiction
Video games about time travel
Video games developed in Germany
Video games featuring female protagonists
Video games set in Brazil
Video games set in Norway
Video games set in San Francisco
Video games set in 1982
Video games set in the 2050s
Windows games